The Portuguese conquest of Asilah (Portuguese: Arzila) in modern Morocco from the Wattasids took place on 24 August 1471.

History
Continuing with his policy of expansion of the Portuguese territories in Morocco, and with the spirit of Crusade against the Muslims always present, King Afonso V of Portugal initially set plans to conquer Tangier, but subsequently decided to conquer Arzila.

Departing from the Portuguese town of Lagos with an army of about 30,000 men and 400 ships, Afonso V arrived at the Moroccan coast on the afternoon of 22 August 1471. The Portuguese King summoned his Council and decided to attack Asilah on the morning of the following day. There was a terrible storm and a number of Portuguese ships were lost. It poured rain the entire three days of the siege.

The storm was so severe it prevented the ships from laying down a cannon bombardment, and only two pieces of heavy artillery were brought to shore. After a troubled disembarkation that resulted in the death of more than 200 men caused by strong winds and waves, Afonso's army reached the shore and laid siege to the city of Asilah, conquering it after a hard battle on 24 of August, 1471.

The Count of Valença, Henrique de Menezes, was appointed as the first Portuguese governor of Asilah by King Afonso V.

The victory at Asilah paved the way for the unopposed conquest of Tangier four days later on 28 August 1471.

Pastrana Tapestries

In the late 15th century, a set of four large tapestries was commissioned to commemorate the battle. They were woven by Flemish weavers in Tournai, Belgium. The tapestries are notable highly for their portrayal of a contemporary event. The works are regarded as among the finest Gothic tapestries in existence.

See also
Portuguese Empire
Wattasid dynasty
House of Avis
Conquest of Ceuta
Edward of Portugal
Henry the Navigator
Fernando, the Saint Prince

Notes

References

Jeremy Black, Cambridge illustrated atlas, warfare: Renaissance to revolution, 1492-1792 (1996) 
Bailey Wallys Diffie,Boyd C. Shafer,George Davison Winius, Foundations of the Portuguese empire, 1415-1580 (1977) 
Ignacio da Costa Quintella, Academia das Ciências de Lisboa, Annaes da marinha portugueza, Volume 1 (1839)

Asilah
Asilah
15th century in Morocco
1471 in the Portuguese Empire
Asilah
Morocco–Portugal military relations